The Asom Bharatiya Janata Party is a break-away group of the Bharatiya Janata Party in Assam. ABJP was founded by senior BJP leader and former Deputy Inspector General of Police, Hiranya Bhattacharya in 2001. Bhattacharya had objected to the decision of BJP to align with the Asom Gana Parishad.

Asom BJP contested the 2001 state assembly polls unsuccessfully.

References

Political parties in Assam
Indian Hindu political parties
Bharatiya Janata Party breakaway groups
2001 establishments in Assam
Political parties established in 2001